The Western Australian Legislative Council was elected from six multi-member electoral regions, which are in turn composed of electoral districts which are used to elect the Legislative Assembly. The current number of electoral regions was established on 22 May 1989. Initially, the South West and Northern Metropolitan regions returned seven members to the Legislative Council, while the other regions each returned five members. This arrangement was changed to have each region return six members for the 2008 Western Australian election, increasing the total number of members from 34 to 36. Before 1989 electoral divisions for the Legislative Council  were known as electoral provinces.

The boundaries of electoral regions that applied to the 2021 Western Australian state general election were finalised in November 2019 by the Electoral Distribution Commissioners.

On 16 September 2021, the McGowan Labor Government introduced the Constitutional and Electoral Legislation Amendment (Electoral Equality) Bill 2021 to abolish the electoral regions and replace them with a system whereby the whole state functions as a single "whole of state" electorate that will now elect 37 members of the Legislative Council. The Bill was passed by Parliament on 17 November 2021 and received the Governor's assent on 24 November 2021.  Transitional provisions in the Constitutional and Electoral Legislation Amendment (Electoral Equality) Act 2021 provide that the former provisions in the Electoral Act 1907 continue to apply in respect of a Council vacancy prior to 21 May 2025 and in respect of representation of members elected prior to the amending provisions.  This means that by-elections for the Legislative Assembly and any vacancy in relation to a member of the Legislative Council will still be based on the 2019 redistribution, until the 2025 state general election.

Current electoral regions
The current electoral regions structure was created in 1989. Initially, the South West and Northern Metropolitan regions returned seven members to the Legislative Council, while the other regions each returned five members. This arrangement was changed to have each region return six members for the 2008 Western Australian election. A redistribution of boundaries of and divisions in regions took place in 2015 and in 2019. The next redistribution will commence in March 2023 and is likely to be finalised by November of that year.

Note: The metropolitan regions (marked *) use the 2013 area information.

The structure of the regions prior to the 2015 redistribution was as follows:

Legend:

Former electoral provinces
Before 1989 electoral divisions for the Legislative Council were known as electoral provinces.
The Constitution Acts Amendment Act (No.2) 1963, effective from the 1965 state election, abolished the ten existing three-member provinces, replacing them with 15 two-member provinces. One new province was added at the 1977 state election. Some of the new provinces bore the same names as the previous provinces.

Metropolitan

Rural

 Central Province
 Lower Central Province
 Lower North Province
 Lower West Province
 North Province
 South-East Province
 South Province
 South-West Province
 Upper West Province
 West Province

See also
 Electoral districts of Western Australia
 Regions of Western Australia

References